The 2021–22 synchronized skating season began on July 1, 2021, and ended on June 30, 2022. Running concurrent with the 2021–22 figure skating season. During this season, elite synchronized skating teams competed in the ISU Championship level at the 2022 World Championships, and through the Challenger Series. They also competed at various other elite level international and national competitions.

From March 1, 2022 onwards, the International Skating Union banned all athletes and officials from Russia and Belarus from attending any international competitions due to the 2022 Russian invasion of Ukraine.

Competitions 
The 2021–22 season included the following major competitions.

 Key

Cancelled Events

International medalists

References 

2021 in figure skating
2022 in figure skating
Seasons in synchronized skating